State Route 150 (SR 150) is a state highway in the U.S. state of California. It runs from U.S. Route 101 near the Ventura/Santa Barbara County line to State Route 126 in Santa Paula, providing a connection to Lake Casitas and Ojai. It is a two-lane road. There were some one-lane bridges near the western end of the route, but these were rebuilt to be two-lane bridges after flooding in 2005.

Route description

The western terminus is at US 101 in eastern Carpinteria. It climbs above the Pacific Ocean to reach the mountains west of Lake Casitas. The portion of the road between US 101 and Lake Casitas is called Casitas Pass Road, and the portion between Lake Casitas and Ojai is called Baldwin Road. However, this part of the road is rural and is not used as a primary thoroughfare. SR 33 is recommended to reach Ojai from U.S. 101. SR 150 joins SR 33 (Maricopa Highway) near Meiners Oaks and remains co-signed with the route into the Ojai city limits, where it is known as Ojai Avenue. It runs southeast on Ojai-Santa Paula Road and serves as the major connector between the cities of Ojai and Santa Paula, running past Thomas Aquinas College. In Santa Paula, it becomes 10th Street and ends at an interchange with SR 126.  

The other names of Route 150 include Rincon Road (starts at U.S. Route 101 and ends at State Route 192), Casitas Pass Road (starts at Route 192 and ends at Santa Ana Road near Lake Casitas), Baldwin Road (starts at Santa Ana Road and ends at the south junction with Route 33), Ventura Avenue (co-signed with Route 33), Ojai Avenue (starts at the north junction with Route 33 and ends at Reeves Road, approximately one mile east of the east limit of Ojai), Santa Paula/Ojai Road (starts at Reeves Road and ends at the north limit of the City of Santa Paula), Ojai Road (starts at the north limit of Santa Paula and ends at Santa Paula Street in Santa Paula) and 10th Street (starts on Santa Paula Street in Santa Paula and ends at Route 126).

SR 150 south of the outer Ojai city limits is part of the National Highway System, a network of highways that are considered essential to the country's economy, defense, and mobility by the Federal Highway Administration. This route is eligible for the State Scenic Highway System, but it is not officially designated as a scenic highway by the California Department of Transportation.

History
The route was opened in 1897. Before the construction of US 101, it was part of the main highway between Los Angeles and Santa Barbara. Originally, State Route 150 followed the alignment of State Route 192 through the Santa Barbara foothills and climbed up San Marcos Pass via the present-day route of State Route 154 before heading west on State Route 246, passing through Santa Ynez, Solvang, and Buellton and ending in Lompoc at State Route 1 (Cabrillo Highway).

Major intersections

See also

References

External links

Caltrans: Route 150 highway conditions
California Highways: Route 150
California @ AARoads.com - State Route 150

150
State Route 150
State Route 150
Ojai, California
Santa Paula, California